John West (December 14, 1590 – c. 1659) was an early member of the Virginia General Assembly and acting colonial Governor of Virginia from 1635 to 1637, the third West brother to serve as Governor and one of the founders of the West Family of Virginia, which would include many politicians.

Early and family life
The fifth son and twelfth child of Thomas West, 2nd Baron De La Warr, was born at Testwood in Hampshire, England. His brother Thomas West, 3rd Baron De La Warr was the largest investor in the London Company which received a charter to establish settlers in the New World, then financed several voyages, including those which founded a settlement at Jamestown in 1609. Thomas West, Lord Delaware, was the first governor of what became the Virginia colony, serving from 1608 until 1618. However, first John West was educated, including beginning in 1609 at Magdalen College, from which he received a degree in 1613.

Virginia

John West arrived in Virginia in 1618, several years after his brother Francis West who served on the Governor's Council. Fellow colonists thrice elected John West a member of the House of Burgesses (1628–30), and he represented the "Plantations over the water" alongside John Burland, then Robert Fellgate, until the end of that constituency.

In 1630, authorities made the decision to plant a settlement on the York River, "... for the securing & taking in of a tract  of Land called ye fforest bordering uppon the cheife residence of ye Pamunkey King the most dangerous head of the Indian enemy ...[sic]"  John West received one of the first grants issued for this purpose, 600 acres  "on the east side of Felgates".  "Felgates" refers to Robert Felgate's 1632 grant of "350 acres lying at Kiskeyacke upon Pamunkey". West sold the 600 acres, along with adjoining land, to Edward Digges in 1650. It became known as the "E.D." plantation, renamed by later owners as "Belfield".

Meanwhile, in 1635, after the "thrusting out" of Governor Sir John Harvey, John West was chosen as temporary replacement, and served until 1637 when Harvey was restored to his position.  In 1640 West was ordered to England, along with three other "thrusters", to answer charges in the Star Chamber. All four were eventually cleared, and returned to Virginia.

In May 1651, West patented 1,550 acres even further upstream on the York River's south branch that he would later sell to Major William Lewis. West patented 850 acres further upstream on the York River in 1652, which patent was granted the following year. In 1654 West also patented 1,000 acres in Gloucester County. Thus, he owned approximately 3,300 acres near the junction of the Mattaponi and Pamunkey Rivers, which thereby become the York River. The site eventually developed into a town first called "West Point" to acknowledge his family, then for much of the 19th century was called "Delaware" to honor his brother the Baron De La Warr, before returning to the initial name of West Point. By 1655, West was living on the plantation he had established near West Point, called Richmond West Plantation.

Marriage and children
John West married Anne Percy, daughter of George Percy and Anne Floyd.

The couple's eldest son, John, married Unity Croshaw. Their younger sons Thomas West and Nathaniel West also became burgesses, as did other relatives.

Death and legacy
The former Governor John West died in the winter of 1659/1660, and was buried at the Jamestown church. In March 1659/1660, the Virginia Assembly passed the following act in recognition of his family's services to the colonial enterprise:

West's 3,000-acre land grant on the York River became the location of the present town of West Point, Virginia. After his death the land passed to his son John West (who also served as a burgess), then to his grandson John West III and to his great-grandson Charles West. Charles West had no issue. His will (dated 28 September 1734) left the West Point estate to his mother, and after her death to his first cousin Thomas West (son of his father's brother Thomas) "and the heirs male of his body lawfully begotten, for ever ..."  The entail was broken in November 1761, when a trust was established to enable 1,000 acres of the land to be sold in order to purchase slaves.

Ancestry

References

1590 births
1659 deaths
Colonial governors of Virginia
People from New Forest District
Younger sons of barons
John West I
English emigrants
Burials at Jamestown Church
People from West Point, Virginia